Ajavon is a surname. Notable people with the surname include:

Matee Ajavon (born 1986), American basketball player
Robert Ajavon (1910–1996), Togolese politician